The Christianization of the Sámi people in Norway and Sweden–Finland took place in stages during a several centuries long process. The Sámi were 
Christianized in a similar way in both Norway and Sweden–Finland.

Background - Christianity presence 

There were Christian missionaries in Sápmi already during the Roman Catholic middle ages, and Christianity co-existed with traditional Sámi shamanism. In 1389, the Sami Margareta (missionary) travelled south to request Christian missionaries.

It was however not until the 17th-century, when the kingdoms of Denmark-Norway and Sweden started to colonize Sápmi, that Christianity truly made its presence known.

Christianization by coercion

Denmark-Norway

In the Kingdoms of Denmark-Norway, the Sami religion was banned on death penalty as witchcraft. During the 17th-century, the persecution of the followers of Sami religion were more intensely persecuted than before by Christian missionaries, and several Sami were persecuted for sorcery because they practiced the Sami religion.  A fifth of all charged with sorcery in Norway are estimated to have been Pagan Sami.  During the 17th-century, a more intense Christian mission was launched in Norway to convert the Sami people to Christianity. However, there was an awareness' that this campaign only caused the Sami to behave outwardly as Christians and kept practicing their own religion in secrecy. This fact was pointed out by the Sami missionaries, who stated that it would not be possible to truly convert the Sami people if the Sami religion could not even be discussed, which was not possible when Pagans were afraid to be accused of witchcraft if they admitted to be Pagans.

Sweden-Finland
The Protestant church was hostile to Sámi shamanism, which it considered to be Pagan idolatry, and wished to exterminate it and Christianize the Sámi people, in parallel with the royal powers wishing to assert their political dominance over the territory and use its economic resources. In the first half of the 17th-century, churches were built in Sápmi by the order of king Charles IX of Sweden, and the Sámi people were compelled to subject themselves to the law of Sweden by attending them.   

They were however silently allowed to practice Sámi shamanism in private until the second half of the 17th-century, when Swedish authorities forced them to abandon their religion, burning their Sámi drums, banning the joik singing and forcing them to subject to the doctrine of the church both in public and private.

Conversion in practice

Denmark-Norway
In the 18th-century, the Christian mission among the Sami in Norway achieved actual success, after the Christian missionaries convinced the authorities to grant the Sami amnesty from the witchcraft law, which made it possible for Pagans to openly discuss their religion without the risk of getting arrested for witchcraft.  In parallel, the Pietist Mission in Copenhagen sent the missionary Thomas von Westen to the Norwegian Sami people in Finnmarken
where he was active in 1716-1727. Thomas von Westen used a new method. Instead of doing as the previous missionaries and force the Sami to practice outward Christianity, such as to attend church, he focused on personal theological persuasion. It was he who convinced the authorities to grant declare the Sami religion no longer illegal: he then informed himself of the religion, and convinced the Sami to convert with a focus on the idea of personal conviction and confession, which proved very efficient.

Sweden-Finland
The Sámi people still continued to practice Sámi shamanism in secrecy until the second half of the 18th-century, when missionaries of first the Pietism and then eventually the Laestadianism sect had true success in their mission and the Sámi people converted to Christianity.

The mission of Thomas von Westen in Norway proved so efficient that the Swedish Pietists under Daniel Djurberg made use of it during their mission among the Sami in Sweden. In contrast to the coercive 17th-century mission, which forced the Sami to outward Christianity, the 18th-century Pietist mission appears to have been truly successful, although the conversion progressed slowly. Around the 1770s, the Sami people were reportedly Christian, talked about the Sami religion as the religion of their ancestors rather than their own, and were reported to have good knowledge about Christianity by the Sami priests. The Christian mission among the Sami did however continue until as late as the mid 19th-century, when Laestadianism became very successful among the Sami people.

See also
 Lars Nilsson (shaman)
 Rijkuo-Maja
Sampo Lappelill
 Arjeplog blasphemy trial of 1687
 College of Missions#Sami_mission

References

 Henrysson, Sten, Samer, präster och skolmästare: ett kulturellt perspektiv på samernas och Övre Norrlands historia, Centrum för arktisk forskning, Univ., Umeå, 1993

Christianization of Europe
Persecution of Pagans
Sámi history
Persecution of Sámi people
17th century in Sweden
18th century in Sweden
17th century in Norway
18th century in Norway
17th century in Finland
18th century in Finland